Savelyevka is a rural locality (a selo) in Tanalyksky Selsoviet, Khaybullinsky District, Bashkortostan, Russia. The population was 205 as of 2010. There are 3 streets.

Geography 
Savelyevka is located 34 km northeast of Akyar (the district's administrative centre) by road. Podolsk is the nearest rural locality.

References 

Rural localities in Khaybullinsky District